Homodes crocea is a species from the genus Homodes. This species was originally described by Achille Guenée in 1852.

References

External links

Taxa named by Achille Guenée
Boletobiinae